The Astral propagation model is an underwater sound propagation loss model. It began as a model for predicting range-smoothed (over 30–40 nm) propagation loss (PL) in a range dependent environment in the late 1970s and was developed by C. W. Spoffard. A convergence zone and surface duct capability was added in the mid-1980s, after which it underwent testing by the US Navy along with range dependent Raymode and the Parabolic Equation (PE) model. As a result of these tests, ASTRAL became one of the official US Navy's range dependent PL models along with PE.

References

Further reading
L. S. Blumen and C. W. Spofford, ASTRAL Model, Vol. II: Software Implementation, Report SAI-79-743-WA, January 1979.

Military equipment